Gorgon is a surname. It may refer to:

 Agnieszka Gorgoń-Komor (born 1970), Polish politician
 Alexander Gorgon (born 1988), Polish-Austrian footballer
 Barbara Gorgoń (1936–2020), Polish luger
 Jerzy Gorgoń (born 1949), Polish footballer

See also
 

Polish-language surnames